"Bruises" is a song by American pop rock band Train from their sixth studio album, California 37. The song features American country singer Ashley Monroe. It was released as the album's third single on October 5, 2012. "Bruises" was re-recorded with French-Canadian singer Marilou in both English and French for its Canadian single release.

Development
In an interview with Radio.com, Monahan said that he had met Ashley Monroe when she was nineteen, and she wanted to write a song with him, which they eventually did through a contact in Columbia Records. Monahan said that he wrote the song in New York, and it was about running into former high school classmates: "I run into people I went to high school with and realize how much older we are, and how much more we’ve been through and a lot of it isn’t all that fun and it makes us more beautiful if you can see it that way. That song was really easy to write because it is a very true story and Ashley was the perfect girl to sing on it."

Music video
A music video was filmed with Monroe for the U.S. release; it was directed by Alan Ferguson. It premiered on Train's official Vevo account on November 12, 2012. The video was filmed at the Red Rocks Amphitheatre at  Red Rocks Park in Colorado.

Live performances
A live recording of the song with Megan Slankard is featured on the California 37 deluxe edition DVD. During the group's June 2012 show at the Sydney Opera House, Train were joined by Australian singer Delta Goodrem on the song.

On February 1, 2013, Train and Ashley Monroe performed the song on VH1's 2013 Best Super Bowl Concert Ever. They performed the song during the Mermaids of Alcatraz Tour that run that summer, and on The Today Show on July 26.

Track listing
 Digital download (United States)
"Bruises"  – 3:52

 Digital download (Canada)
"Bruises"  – 3:50
"Bruises" (French version)  – 3:50

Charts
As of October 2013, the song has sold 463,000 digital copies in the United States.

Year-end charts

Certifications

Release history

References

2012 singles
Train (band) songs
Songs written by Espen Lind
Songs written by Amund Bjørklund
Songs written by Pat Monahan
Song recordings produced by Butch Walker
Columbia Records singles
Song recordings produced by Espionage (production team)
Ashley Monroe songs
2012 songs
Music videos directed by Alan Ferguson (director)